Little Fauss and Big Halsy is a soundtrack album to the 1970 film of the same name. Released on Columbia Records in 1971, it features primarily songs by country singer Johnny Cash (and is his 37th overall album). The album includes tracks written by Cash, Carl Perkins and Bob Dylan, as well as several tracks performed by Perkins, but did not chart.

Track listing

Note: Tracks 11-13 were not issued on the original vinyl release but were bonus tracks on the 1999 Bear Family CD reissue I Walk the Line/Little Fauss and Big Halsy

Personnel
Johnny Cash - vocals (except track 9 and instrumental tracks), guitar
Carl Perkins - vocals (track 9), guitar
Bob Wootton - guitar
Marshall Grant - bass guitar
W.S. Holland - drums
The Carter Family - vocals

Charts
Album – Billboard (United States)

References

External links

Comedy-drama film soundtracks
Albums produced by Bob Johnston
1971 soundtrack albums
Johnny Cash soundtracks
Columbia Records soundtracks